The men's triple jump at the 2010 African Championships in Athletics was held on July 31.

Results

External links
Results

Triple
Triple jump at the African Championships in Athletics